Angus Donald (born 1965 in China) is a British writer of historical fiction. As of 2020, he has released ten novels and three novellas that loosely follow the story of Alan-a-Dale.

Biography
Donald's parents being British diplomats, much of his childhood was spent in various places around the world, including Greece, Hong Kong, Zaire and Indonesia. After graduating from the University of Edinburgh, Donald worked as a fruit-picker in Greece, a waiter in New York and as an "anthropologist studying magic and witchcraft" in Indonesia. He subsequently worked as a journalist in Hong Kong, New Delhi, Pakistan, Islamabad and Afghanistan before attempting to write his first novel.

Books

The Outlaw Chronicles
 Outlaw (2009)
 Holy Warrior (2010)
 King's Man (2011)
 Warlord (2012)
 Grail Knight (2013)
 The Iron Castle (2014)
 The King's Assassin (2015)
 The Death of Robin Hood (2016)
 Robin Hood and the Caliph's Gold (2020)
 Robin Hood and the Castle of Bones (2020)

Holcroft Blood Novels
 Blood´s Game (2017)
 Blood´s Revolution (2018)
 Blood´s Campaign (2019)

Novellas
 The Rise of Robin Hood (2013)
 The Betrayal of Father Tuck (2013)
 The Hostility of Hanno (2013)

Fire Born Series
 The Last Berserker (2021)
 The Saxon Wolf (2022)

References

External links
 

1965 births
Living people
Alumni of the University of Edinburgh
21st-century British novelists
Writers of historical fiction set in the Middle Ages
English historical novelists
British male novelists
21st-century English male writers